Chima Simone (born July 28, 1982) is a TV personality and freelance journalist, best known as a former reality show contestant from Big Brother 11. She is also notable for surviving an attack by the Bathtub Killer, Dale Devon Scheanette. Her story was recounted in the true crime cable television show Cold Case Files and again in the documentary shows Unusual Suspects and Surviving Evil on Investigation Discovery.

Career
Simone has been a journalist for several television networks, including BET, MTV and The CW.  She has also been a backstage interviewer for the BET Awards. Simone worked as an entertainment reporter with the Hollyscoop Show, a celebrity news television series and website. The nationally syndicated show, debuted Sunday, August 30, 2009 on KTLA, is based on the website of the same name. She also covered season 12 of Big Brother and season 4 of The Real Housewives of Atlanta for entertainment news website The Wrap, syndicated on MSN.
She continues to cover entertainment for various outlets, including E! Online.

Big Brother

Simone was a contestant on the eleventh season of the American version of the reality show Big Brother where she competed as part of the Brains Clique. Former cast member, Marcellas Reynolds, helped Simone bypass the initial phases of the audition process. She was cast, despite having numerous television appearances prior.

Midway through the show on day 42, Simone was expelled by producers, who alleged that Simone had violated several of show's rules, including refusing to wear her microphone and later destroying her microphone by throwing it into the jacuzzi.  Simone refutes the expulsion in several statements issued upon her departure, explaining she quit a game she could not win due to producer manipulation. The broadcast of Simone's departure delivered “Big Brother’s” largest audience since 2008 and highest ratings in all key demos on any night that summer (highest adult 18-49 rating since the 8th edition finale in 2007).

Chima Simone's ratings topping drama earned her a spot on People Magazines "Reality TV's 10 Best Catfights & Meltdowns". Simone was also included in Yahoo! TVs "Top 10 Reality Moments of 2009".

Awards
Simone was nominated in the best Best Villain category at the Fox Reality Really Awards. She attended and was accompanied by Romain Chavent (2009)

References

External links

 

African-American television personalities
American women television journalists
American television journalists
Big Brother (American TV series) contestants
Living people
1982 births
Place of birth missing (living people)
21st-century African-American people
21st-century African-American women
20th-century African-American people
20th-century African-American women